The Gold Coast Music Awards is an annual awards night celebrating the Australian music industry based in the Gold Coast.

Founded in 2015 by Samantha Morris, Chloe Popa and Amanda Gorman, the awards are produced by the Gold Coast Music Network, with support from City of Gold Coast and Major Events Gold Coast. 2021's finalists were announced in August 2021, with the awards held on September 4. The People's Choice Award was opened to public voting from 19 August, with all finalists automatically nominated.

Categories

Current 
Since 2015 the categories have evolved. The most recent addition was the Gold Coast Music Prize in 2020.

Retired

2015 Gold Coast Music Awards 
The 2015 awards took place on July 22 at Burleigh Heads, Gold Coast. Finalist were announced in June. The winners were the following.

Local Music Champion of the year

Polly Snowden

Emerging Artist of the year

Hanlon Brothers

Live Music Venue of the year

Soundlounge

Band/Artist of the year

Karl S Williams

Live Music Event of the year

Buskers By The Creek

Song of the year

Lane-Harry X Ike Campbell - Anarchy

People’s Choice

Casey Barnes

2016 Gold Coast Music Awards 
The 2016 awards took place on June 16. The winners were the following.

Music Champion of the year

Guy Cooper

Emerging Artist of the year

Leopold's Treat

Live Music Venue of the year

Nightquarter

Artist of the year

Hussy Hicks

Event of the year

Blues On Broadbeach

Song of the year

Ella Fence - Unknown Water

Music Video of the year

Ella Fence - Unknown Water

People’s Choice

Jason McGregor

2017 Gold Coast Music Awards 
The 2017 awards took place on 27 April at Surfers Paradise. The winners were the following.

Breakout Artist of the year

Tesla Cøils

Venue of the year

elsewhere

Artist of the year

Amy Shark

Event of the year

Blues on Broadbeach

Song of the year

Amy Shark -  Adore

Album of the year

Lane Harry x Ike Campbell - Youth

Video of the year

The Black Swamp - Common Crows

People’s Choice

Being Jane Lane

2018 Gold Coast Music Awards 
The 2018 awards took place on 3 May. The winners were the following.

Album of the year

Hussy Hicks - On The Boundaries

Artist of the year

Amy Shark

Breakout artist of the year

Hollow Coves

Event of the year

Shakafest

Live act of the year

The Mason Rack Band

Song of the year

Hollow Coves - Coastline

Venue of the year

Miami Tavern Shark Bar

Video of the year

Lane Harry x Ike Campbell - The Dash

2019 Gold Coast Music Awards 
The 2019 awards took place on 2 May. The winners were the following.

Hall Of Fame Inductee

Amy Shark

Artist of the year

Amy Shark

Breakout Artist of the year

San Mei

Live Act of the year

Amy Shark

Musician of the year

Ian Peres

Release of the year

Amy Shark - Love Monster

Song of the year

San Mei - Wonder

Venue of the year

Vinnies Dive

Video of the year

YT DiNGO - Shipwrecked

People’s Choice

Elska

2020 Gold Coast Music Awards 
The 2020 awards took place on 30 April and were streamed on Facebook. The winners were the following.

Artist Of The Year

Casey Barnes

Breakout Artist of the year

Eliza And The Delusionals

Live Act of the year

Tijuana Cartel

Musician of the year

Julz Parker (Hussy Hicks)

Release of the year

Busby Marou - The Great Divide

Song of the year

DVNA - Looking Like A Snack

Venue of the year

HOTA: Home Of The Arts

Video of the year

Eddie Ray - The Story

Gold Coast Music Prize

DENNIS.

People’s Choice

Lagerstein

2021 Gold Coast Music Awards 
The 2021 awards took place on 4 September. The winners were the following.

Artist of the year

Casey Barnes

Breakout of the year

Jesswar

Live Act of the year

Peach Fur

Musician of the year

Scott French

Release of the year

Karl S Williams - Lifeblood

Song of the year

Beckah Amani - Standards

Venue of the year

Mo's Desert Clubhouse

Video of the year

Beckah Amani - Standards

Gold Coast Music Prize

Selve

People’s Choice

Euca

References 

2015 establishments in Australia
Australian music awards